This is a list of football (soccer) stadiums in the Democratic Republic of the Congo, ranked in descending order of capacity with at least 5,000 Spectators. Some Stadiums are soccer specific and some are used for other proposes.

Existing stadiums

Under Construction

Proposed Stadiums

See also 
List of association football stadiums by capacity
List of African stadiums by capacity

References 

 
Democratic Republic of the Congo
Football in the Democratic Republic of the Congo
Football stadiums